Lambert's Point Deperming Station is a United States Navy deperming facility located in the Elizabeth River just off Lambert's Point, Norfolk, Virginia, United States. It was built in the mid-1940s and services the U.S. Atlantic Fleet.

 

The station, which is administered by Naval Station Norfolk, consists of two parallel pile-supported piers, roughly 1140 ft. (345 m.) in length, which form a slip that can accommodate all Navy and Coast Guard ships up to and including the largest warships afloat, the Nimitz class aircraft carriers. There is a second pier for smaller vessels and support craft. The station has administrative offices and a medical clinic on site. When viewed from the air, the pier configuration resembles the number 41.

References

External links

Mine warfare countermeasures
United States Navy installations
Buildings and structures in Norfolk, Virginia
Military installations in Virginia
Military in Norfolk, Virginia